A bridezilla is a bride whose behavior is seen as demanding or unreasonable. The word comes from bride + -zilla.
 Bridezillas, a reality show which airs on the WE: Women's Entertainment network
 Bridezilla (band), an Australian indie rock band
 Bridezilla (EP), a 2007 recording by the band Bridezilla
 Bridezilla (film), a 2019 comedy-drama